Quentin Willson (born 23 July 1957) is an English television presenter and producer, motoring journalist, author, and former car dealer. He was a presenter of the motoring programmes Britain's Worst Driver, Fifth Gear, and the original incarnation of Top Gear.

Early life
Willson, a twin, is the son of Professor Bernard Willson, latterly the Dean of the Faculty of Arts at University of Leicester, who was the first code breaker at Bletchley Park to decode the Italian Navy Hagelin C-36 code machine.

Education
Willson was educated at Wyggeston Grammar School for Boys, a former state grammar school in Leicester, followed by the University of Leicester, where he studied English Literature.

Early career
After graduation, he founded a car dealership selling Ferraris and Maseratis. In the early 1990s, he was the deputy editor of the only magazine solely devoted to second hand motors, Buying Cars.

In 1988, he was convicted at Coalville Magistrates' Court and fined for falsely advertising the mileage on a Vauxhall Cavalier.

Television
Willson joined the BBC  in 1991 to co-host the original version of Top Gear with Jeremy Clarkson. Until the original format's cancellation in 2001, he appeared every week on the programme, typically as an expert on used cars.

Willson later presented his own produced classic car series The Car's the Star, along with the first property show to talk about money, All The Right Moves, both for the BBC.

After Top Gear's cancellation, he left the BBC to present Channel 5's rival motoring programme, Fifth Gear. When Top Gear was relaunched, Willson said of Clarkson that "It's a compliment that the BBC are so afraid of losing ratings to us, they've lured my old co-host out of semi-retirement."

While at Channel 5, Willson created the Britain's Worst Driver format. A raft of similar shows followed, including Britain's Worst DIYer, "Worst Farmer", Worst Mother in Law, Worst Husband, Worst Teenager, Worst Builder, Worst Zookeeper, and Worst FIFA 2002 Player. After Willson's appearances on Britain’s Worst series, comedian Harry Hill dressed up as him and announced: "I used to be on Top Gear, now I’m on Channel 5. Welcome to Britain’s Worst Career Move". Wilson stopped presenting Fifth Gear in 2005.

Willson also participated in the second series of Strictly Come Dancing in 2004, but ignominiously got the lowest score ever on the show with his one and only dance before being voted off. Willson still holds the record for lowest score ever on Strictly with a grand total of eight out of a possible 40 points. Judge Craig Revel Horwood described Willson as "Britain's Worst Dancer".

On 12 January 2009, and again on 4 December 2010, he appeared on BBC Breakfast giving advice on snow driving and which cars are better suited. On 5 April 2012, he once again appeared on BBC Breakfast talking about the Highway Code. He also regularly featured on the ITV breakfast show Daybreak, when there were motoring related features.

In 2015, Willson returned to Channel 5 to host The Classic Car Show.

Campaigning
In the 1990s, both in print and on television, Willson highlighted the artificially higher prices of new cars in the UK compared to Europe, campaigning for price parity for UK buyers. He is widely credited for drawing attention to uncompetitive pricing by the car makers which prompted the European Commission to take action and use block exemption regulations to force the industry to reduce UK list prices on new passenger cars.

Fair Fuel UK 
From early 2011 until 2021, Willson was the national spokesman for FairFuelUK campaigning for lower government fuel duty. From March 2011, Willson and the FairFuelUK Team successfully pressured the UK government to defer 11p of duty rises, reducing the overall tax take by £5.5 billion in fuel duty. His campaigning appeared on BBC Breakfast, Radio 5 Live, Newsnight, Channel 5 News, Channel 4 News, The Sun, Times, Telegraph, Mail and other national newspapers. The House of Commons Back Bench Committee allowed Willson to be present in the House at a Commons fuel duty debate in 2011.

Fair Fuel UK is an industry-funded lobby group that campaigns against charges and taxes on UK motorists. Its website claims it has “fought off £100bn in FUEL TAX hikes since 2011” and that “pump prices would be 16 to 20 pence more if it was not for the Fair Fuel UK Campaign”. Wilson co-managed the campaign with PR advisor and petrol station manager, Howard Cox. Howard's petrol station specialises on artisan charcoal briquettes that counteract the emissions from the vehicle exhausts created by the allegedly overtaxed fuel.

Fair Fuel UK is funded by two industry associations: the Freight Transport Association and the Road Haulage Association. Its previous funders have included the RAC, the Association of Pallet Networks and UKLPG, among others.

In September 2021 Willson resigned from Fair Fuel UK because he was “unhappy with the direction the lobby group was going and their lack of environmental sensibilities”.

Writing

In 2004, Willson was awarded Motoring Writer of the Year. He writes regularly for The Sunday Mirror and has also written ten books.

 "Top Gear": Good Car Guide by Quentin Willson (BBC Books, 1993)
 "Top Gear": Good Car Guide by Quentin Willson (BBC Books, 1994)
 Classic Cars of the World by Quentin Willson and David Selby (DK Publishing, 1995)
 Ultimate Classic Car by Quentin Willson (DK Publishing, 1995. Republished with David Selby.)
 Classic American Cars by Quentin Willson (DK Publishing, 1997)
 The Quentin Willson Guide to Used Cars: Everything You Need to Know by Quentin Willson (Virgin Books, 2001)
 Quentin Willson's Cool Cars by Quentin Willson (DK Publishing, Second edition 2001)
 Cars, A Celebration by Quentin Willson (DK Publishing, 2001)
 Great Cars by Quentin Willson (DK Publishing, 2001)
 Ultimate Sports Car by Quentin Willson (DK Publishing, 2002)

Consultancy and speaking

Quentin Willson is a consultant to many organisations and companies including the car warranty company Warrantywise. Wilson is also a former consultant to BP, BSI (British Safety Institute) and Castrol Oil in 2008–10. He is also a regular face on the conference and after dinner speaking circuit.
Quentin has been at the forefront of raising awareness about the dangers of buying stolen cars, fronting the 'Real or Rogue' campaign in March 2009.  He also appears in promotional videos on the website for Store First, a self-storage company seeking investors but currently the subject of a BBC investigation into concerns expressed by those investors.

Videos/DVDs

References

External links 
Quentin Willson's Official Website

Quentin Willson Interview
Official Link Top Gear (magazine) website
Official BBC Top Gear website
Sunday Mirror column
The Official Website for the award winning campaign for lower petrol and diesel prices

1957 births
Living people
People from Leicester
People educated at Wyggeston Grammar School for Boys
Alumni of the University of Leicester
English television presenters
BP people
Top Gear people